One of the reforms of the Progressive Era, the New York State Tenement House Act of 1901 was one of the first such laws to ban the construction of dark, poorly ventilated tenement buildings in the state of New York.  Among other sanctions, the law required that new buildings must be built with outward-facing windows in every room, an open courtyard, proper ventilation systems, indoor toilets, and fire safeguards.

Early tenement acts prior to 1901

This was not the first time that New York State passed a public law that specifically dealt with housing reform. The First Tenement House Act (1867) required fire escapes for each suite and a window for every room, the Second Tenement House Act (1879) ("Old Law") closed a loophole by requiring windows to face a source of fresh air and light, not an interior hallway. An amendment of 1887 required privies interior to the building. The failures of the Old Law — the air shafts developed to meet the minimum intent of the Act proved to be unsanitary as they filled with garbage, bilge water, and waste  — led to the 1901 "New Law" and its required courtyard designed for garbage removal.

Agitation for reform

Prior to these housing laws, most reforms were undertaken by philanthropists and private individuals or organizations. This sequence of laws serves as an example of the Progressive belief that cleaner cities made better citizens. Jacob Riis, in his ground-breaking, muckraking journalistic expose of 1890, How the Other Half Lives: Studies Among the Tenements of New York attributes the reform movement to the fear of contagious disease emanating from the ghettos, especially following an outbreak of smallpox, far more contagious than the cholera and tuberculosis that had long dwelt in the Lower East Side of New York, the hub of immigrant ghetto life. He views the laws and the progressive reform movement that motivated them as a confluence of the cynically-minded with the civic-minded, eventually working towards the benefit of the burgeoning city's labor force.

The reform movement culminated in a prominent Tenement-House Exhibit of 1899 held in the old Fifth Avenue Sherry's, a Gilded Age center of elegant society. The comprehensive exhibit, marshaled by Lawrence Veiller, covered a wide range of urban concerns including bathhouses and parks, pushing reform for the first time far beyond mere building design into the broader concerns of urban planning. The exhibit was followed by a two-volume report to the New York State and Texas Tenement House Commission, leading directly to the writing of the 1901 New Law.

Architectural developments

Aesthetically, the New Law coincided with the introduction of Beaux-Arts architecture. The curious sandstone faces and gargoyles and filigreed terracotta of the previous twenty years of tenement design gave way to the more abstractly classical ornamentation of this urbane, international and more grandiose Parisian style. Because the New Law's required courtyard consumed more space than the 1879 law's air shaft, New Law tenements tend to be built on multiple lots or on corner lots to conserve space for dwelling units—the source of revenue for the tenement owner. A typical Lower East Side or East Village street will be lined with five-story, austerely unornamented pre-law (pre-1879) and six-story, fancifully decorated old law (pre 1901) tenements with the much bulkier grand-style New Law Tenements on the corners, always at least six stories tall.

See also
 Tenement (law)
 Lower East Side Tenement National Historic Site

References
Footnotes

Sources

  Chapter 334, enacted 12 April 1901.

External links 
 Tenement Museum's description of the NY Tenement Law

Housing in New York (state)
1901 in American law
1901 in New York (state)
New York (state) statutes
Progressive Era in the United States